Cicero (106–43 BC), full name Marcus Tullius Cicero, was a Roman statesman, lawyer, political theorist, philosopher and one of Rome's greatest orators.

Cicero may also refer to:

Places
Cicero, Illinois
Cicero Avenue, a north–south street
Cicero (CTA Blue Line station)
Cicero (CTA Pink Line station)
Cicero (CTA Green Line station)
Cicero station (Metra)
Cicero, Indiana
Cicero, Kansas
Cicero, New York
Cicero, Ohio
Cicero, Wisconsin, a town
Cicero (community), Wisconsin, an unincorporated community

Ships
 Cicero (1796 ship), a West Indiaman and whaler
 Cicero (1819 ship), a whaler
 HMS Cicero (F170), a 1943 infantry landing ship

Other uses
 Cicero (horse), a racehorse owned by Archibald Primrose, 5th Earl of Rosebery
 Cicero (magazine), a German political magazine
 Cicero (typography), a unit of measure in typesetting used in France and several other countries
 9446 Cicero, a Main-Belt asteroid
 Cicero: The Philosophy of a Roman Sceptic, 2015 book by Raphael Woolf
 Cicero Stadium, a sports stadium in Asmara, Eritrea
 Centre for International Climate and Environmental Research, a research centre in Oslo, Norway
 Elyesa Bazna or Cicero, Albanian who spied for Germany in World War II

People with the name
 Andrea Lo Cicero (born 1976), Italian rugby player
 Chic Cicero (born 1936), founder and co-Chief of the modern Hermetic Order of the Golden Dawn
 Cicero, code name for Elyesa Bazna (1904—1970), secret agent for Nazi Germany during World War II
 David Cicero (born 1970), Scottish singer and keyboardist
 Nando Cicero (1931–1995), Italian director and actor
 Padre Cícero (1844–1934), pr Cícero Romão Batista, Brazilian priest
 Roger Cicero (1970–2016), German singer
 Quintus Tullius Cicero (died 43 BC), younger brother of Marcus Tullius Cicero who served in government as an author
 Tabatha Cicero, co-chief of the modern Hermetic Order of the Golden Dawn
 Cicero Minor (born 65 BC), son of Marcus Tullius Cicero and Roman consul
 Cícero Santos (born 1984), Brazilian footballer
 Cícero Semedo (born 1986), Portuguese football player

Fictional
 Marcus Tullius Cicero (Rome character)
 Paul Cicero, a character in Goodfellas
 Cicero Pig, a character in Porky Pig films
 Cicero, a character in Gladiator
 Cicero, a character in Mutt and Jeff
 Cicero, a character in The Elder Scrolls V: Skyrim

See also
 Cicerone (disambiguation)
 Cicinho or Little Cicero (born 1980), or, Brazilian footballer
 Commonwealth Scientific and Industrial Research Organisation
 List of ships named Cicero